In process engineering Dry process may refer to:

Dry process (cement) used in cement manufacture using Cement kilns
Dry spinning process in fibre spinning
Dry process in Coffee production
Dry process in Coconut oil production
Dry process in the manufacture of Separators for electrochemical cells